The 1928 Baltic Cup was held in Tallinn at Kadrioru Stadium on 25–27 July 1928. It was the first time three Baltic countries — Estonia, Latvia and Lithuania — came together to play a friendly tournament and determine the best team amongst them. Latvia won the tournament, beating both opponents.

Results

Statistics

Goalscorers

See also
Baltic Cup
Nordic Football Championship

References

External links
 Tournament overview at EU-Football.info

1928
1928–29 in European football
1928 in Lithuanian football
1928 in Latvian football
1928 in Estonian football
1928